Hollywood United Methodist Church is a United Methodist church located at the intersection of Franklin Avenue and Highland Avenue in the Hollywood Heights neighborhood of Los Angeles, California.  Its English Gothic architecture and the giant HIV/AIDS Red Ribbon on the bell-tower have made it a prominent landmark in Hollywood. The church's facilities, in addition to housing an active congregation, are used by the private non-religious Oaks School and have been the settings for many movies including Sister Act and Back to the Future.

History

The First Methodist Episcopal Church of Hollywood was built in 1911 by a group of congregants who began organizing the new church in 1909. It was built in the Mission Revival style and cost $35,000 at the time, but due to its limited seating capacity of 800 it was demolished in the late 1920s to make way for a larger structure.

Construction on the first replacement building, the Recreational Hall, was started in 1927, and the rest of the structure was completed on March 16, 1930.

The building was adopted as Los Angeles Historic-Cultural Monument #248 in 1981.

The church erected a large red ribbon on its bell tower in 1993 in honor of World AIDS day. The ribbons were replaced with more permanent versions in 1996, and were repainted in 2004. Since then, the church has been at the forefront of fighting for gay rights within the United Methodist Church, and has attracted a largely LGBT congregation.

Architecture

The church building was designed by Thomas P. Barber, and based in part on the English Gothic style of Westminster Hall in London. The structure is steel-framed concrete, which makes it relatively earthquake resistant, and was realized with the contribution of the Italian structural engineer Francesco (Ciccio) Sabato Ceraldi. The church is also an example of American Gothic architecture with its sanctuary roof having an open hammer beam construction.

Use as a movie filming location

Due to its convenient location near several Hollywood movie studios and its mixture of Gothic and modern architecture, the church has been used frequently as a filming location for Hollywood movies. The "Enchantment Under the Sea" dance scenes in Back to the Future and Back to the Future Part II were filmed in the church's gymnasium, as was the talent show scene in That Thing You Do!. Interior scenes for the movie Sister Act were filmed in the hallways, classrooms, and offices of the church, although the film crew repainted the interior to make it appear much older. Scenes from The War of the Worlds, Anger Management, Big Momma's House, Jarhead, and several other movies were filmed on the premises.

The Oaks School

The Oaks School is an independent private K-6 school founded in 1985 which rents space from the church. The school is non-religious and not affiliated with the church, although the school and church communities do work together frequently and share some staff.

See also
 Los Angeles Historic-Cultural Monuments in Hollywood
 Hollywood Heights, Los Angeles

Notes

Churches in Los Angeles
United Methodist churches in California
Churches completed in 1930
1930 in California
Los Angeles Historic-Cultural Monuments
Buildings and structures in Hollywood, Los Angeles
Hollywood Hills